Bodhei is a settlement in Kenya's Lamu County.

References 

Populated places in Coast Province
Lamu County